Jörg Volkmann (born 25 January 1958) is a German fencer. He competed in the team sabre event at the 1984 Summer Olympics.

References

External links
 

1958 births
Living people
German male fencers
Olympic fencers of West Germany
Fencers at the 1984 Summer Olympics
Sportspeople from Bochum